USS Saxis (SP-615) was a United States Navy patrol vessel in commission during 1917.

Saxis was built as a civilian motorboat of the same name by Thomas Scott. On 5 May 1917, the U.S. Navy acquired her from the Virginia Fish Commission for use as a section patrol boat during World War I. Saxis was wrecked when she became stranded at West Point, Virginia, on 7 July 1917.

Presumably Saxis was commissioned as USS Saxis (SP-615) sometime between her acquisition and loss, but one source states without further explanation that Saxis may have been wrecked before seeing any actual U.S. Navy service.

Notes

References

Department of the Navy Naval History and Heritage Command Online Library of Selected Images: U.S. Navy Ships -- Listed by Hull Number: SP-615: Saxis at "SP" #s and "ID" #s -- World War I Era Patrol Vessels and other Acquired Ships and Craft numbered from SP-600 through SP-699
NavSource Online: Section Patrol Craft Photo Archive Saxis (SP 615)

Patrol vessels of the United States Navy
World War I patrol vessels of the United States
Maritime incidents in 1917
Shipwrecks of the Virginia coast
1917 ships